Nguyễn Mạnh Quyền is a former wushu taolu athlete from Vietnam. He is a triple-medalist at the World Wushu Championships and at the Southeast Asian Games. He is also a double-medalist at the Asian Games in the men's daoshu and gunshu event. In 2012, he was the Asian Champion in gunshu.

See also 

 List of Asian Games medalists in wushu

References 

Year of birth missing (living people)
Living people
Vietnamese wushu practitioners
Asian Games medalists in wushu
Asian Games bronze medalists for Vietnam
Medalists at the 2010 Asian Games
Medalists at the 2014 Asian Games
Southeast Asian Games silver medalists for Vietnam
Southeast Asian Games bronze medalists for Vietnam
Southeast Asian Games medalists in wushu
Wushu practitioners at the 2010 Asian Games
Wushu practitioners at the 2014 Asian Games